Diego Joel Torres Garcete (born 14 October 2002) is a Paraguayan footballer who plays as a midfielder for Celaya F.C.

Career statistics

Club

Notes

References

2002 births
Living people
Association football midfielders
Paraguayan footballers
Club Olimpia footballers
Paraguayan Primera División players
Paraguay youth international footballers